Gabriel Silva Azevedo Figueiredo (born 3 July 2002), known as Gabriel Silva, is a Brazilian professional footballer who plays as an attacking midfielder or a forward for Grêmio.

Career

Gabriel Silva started his career with Grêmio.

Honours
Grêmio
Campeonato Gaúcho: 2022
Recopa Gaúcha: 2022, 2023

References

External links
 at the Grêmio FBPA website

2000 births
Living people
Brazilian footballers
Grêmio Foot-Ball Porto Alegrense players